This list of World War I flying aces from Austria-Hungary contains the names of aviators from the countries ruled by the Habsburg dynasty. Austria-Hungary was a constitutional union of the Austrian Empire (Cisleithania) and the Kingdom of Hungary (Transleithania) which  existed from 1867 to 1918, when it collapsed as a result of defeat in World War I. Its territory contained a melange of nationalities. Although the aces of the K.u.k. Luftfahrtruppen owed their military allegiance to the Austro-Hungarian Empire as a whole, they came from various ethnic groups. Despite the Hungarian government's policy of Magyarization, many inhabitants of that kingdom clung to their ethnic identities. The breakup of the Austro-Hungarian Empire post World War I saw the formation of independent nations from some of these ethnic groups.

Flying aces of the Austro-Hungarian Empire

Major background information for this list comes from O'Connor, pp. 272–332. As O'Connor also states on page 9: "Germanic name forms are used for the sake of uniformity and because German was the official language of the Austro-Hungarian Empire." This supplies the most common names of aces as Germanic, while non-German names are appended as aliases.

Listings are based on best available victory-by-victory listings. Every aircrew member significantly contributing to the defeat of an enemy aircraft could be credited with a full victory. All victories counted equally, whether the aviator scored them as a fighter pilot, a reconnaissance pilot, or an aerial observer/gunner.

For six to eight months in early 1918, the rules were tightened to allow only one verified victory per combat claim. This restriction was later revoked, and the former rule of shared victories reinstated, even retroactively.

Austro-Hungarian authorities did credit enemy aircraft that were forced to land as actual victories. This can be noted throughout the victory records of their aces.

Footnote

See also
 List of World War I flying aces from Austria
 List of World War I flying aces from Croatia
 List of World War I Czech flying aces
 List of World War I flying aces from Hungary
 List of World War I aces from Poland
 List of World War I flying aces from Serbia
 List of World War I Slovakian flying aces

References

Sources
 
 
 

Austria-Hungary
World War I aces
aces
World War I aces